Papé Abdoulaye Diakité (born 22 December 1992) is a Senegalese professional footballer who plays as a centre-back for V.League 1 club Hoàng Anh Gia Lai.

Club career

Trenčín
Diakité made his debut for AS Trenčín against Žilina on 24 November 2011.

FC Edmonton
On 8 February 2016, Diakité signed for Edmonton in the North American Soccer League. Diakité later revealed that he had offers from Romania and Bulgaria prior to signing with Edmonton, and originally was not going to sign with the club. After a strong 2016 season, Diakité was named the NASL's Young Player of the Year for the 2016 season

Terengganu FC

in 2022, Diakité moved to Malaysia to join Terengganu. With his calm demeanor and his dexterity in fending off opponents attacks, he was praised in the league.

Career statistics

References

External links
AS Trenčín profile

1992 births
Living people
Senegalese footballers
Footballers from Dakar
Association football defenders
AS Trenčín players
Slovak Super Liga players
Royal Antwerp F.C. players
Challenger Pro League players
Lierse Kempenzonen players
Belgian Third Division players
FC Edmonton players
North American Soccer League players
Pape Diakite
Pape Diakite
Tampa Bay Rowdies players
USL Championship players
Ho Chi Minh City FC players
Saigon FC players
V.League 1 players
Expatriate footballers in Slovakia
Expatriate footballers in Belgium
Expatriate soccer players in Canada
Expatriate footballers in Vietnam
Expatriate footballers in Thailand
Expatriate soccer players in the United States
Senegalese expatriate sportspeople in Slovakia
Senegalese expatriate sportspeople in Belgium
Senegalese expatriate sportspeople in Canada
Senegalese expatriate sportspeople in Vietnam
Senegalese expatriate sportspeople in Thailand
Senegalese expatriate sportspeople in the United States